Oliver Griffen Johnston (30 April 1888 – 22 December 1966) was an English  actor. After training at RADA, his theatre work included the original production of The Barretts of Wimpole Street at Malvern (1930) and its subsequent West End transfer (1930-1932). Johnston started his film career in 1938, when he was already 50 years old. Working until shortly before his death, he appeared in nearly 90 film and television productions, where he often portrayed meek or mild-mannered types in supporting roles.

Johnston had a rather unremarkable film acting career until he was nearly 70 years, when he was discovered by Charlie Chaplin. He is perhaps best-remembered for his role in Chaplin's A King in New York (1957), where he played a large supporting role as the "faithful ambassador and solemn-serious straight man" to Chaplin's King. Afterwards he got more acting offers, including the literature adaption Kidnapped (1960) and fantasy/horror pictures like The Three Lives of Thomasina (1963), The Tomb of Ligeia (1964) and It! (1967).

One of his last roles, released after his death in December 1966 at age 78, was in Chaplin's last film A Countess from Hong Kong (1967). Here Johnston portrayed an old British businessman in Hong Kong, who introduces the leading characters of Marlon Brando and Sophia Loren to each other in the opening scenes.

Selected filmography

References

External links
 

1888 births
1966 deaths
English male stage actors
English male film actors
English male television actors
20th-century English male actors
Alumni of RADA